Onteora Mountain is a mountain located in the Catskill Mountains of New York east-northeast of Hunter. Parker Mountain is located east, and East Jewett Range is located west-northwest of Onteora Mountain.

References

Mountains of Greene County, New York
Mountains of New York (state)